The Council for Mass Media in Finland (abbr. JSN) is a self-regulatory organ of the Finnish mass media. It controls journalists related to publishers who have adopted the good journalistic guidelines and makes resolutions on the bases of appeals. It was established in 1968 and one of its goals was to diminish the need for juridical investigations in the courts mainly caused by criticism of the leftist radicals in the late 1960s.

Chairs
The Council for Mass Media in Finland in earlier times had low-profile chairmen but, since Jacob Söderman, chairmen have given statements related to issues wider than the technical side of the work or resolutions.

See also 
 Press Complaints Commission

References

Mass media in Finland
Mass media complaints authorities
Consumer organisations in Finland
Regulation in Finland
Organizations established in 1968